Hwang Kyung Koh (also known by her pen name Bahrom meaning “to live right”) was the founder and first President of Seoul Women's University. 

Koh's father was a physician and professor at Severance Medical College (now the medical school of Yonsei University). She studied at Ewha Womans College and Doshisha Women's College in Japan before completing her doctorate at Michigan State University.

Koh established Seoul Women's University in 1961 to provide educational opportunities to the women of Korea. SWU is known for an education program based on Dr. Koh's philosophies to foster global female leaders with the firm values of knowledge, integrity, and virtue.

References

1909 births
2000 deaths
South Korean academic administrators
Doshisha Women's College of Liberal Arts alumni
Doshisha University alumni
Michigan State University alumni
Academic staff of Ewha Womans University
University and college founders
Women founders
Presidents of universities and colleges in South Korea
Women heads of universities and colleges
Members of the National Academy of Sciences of the Republic of Korea